Marie-Claude Ossard (born 16 December 1943 in Paris) is a French film producer.

Selected filmography

External links 
 

French film producers
1943 births
Living people